Tamayo Kawamoto (河本 圭代 or かわもと たまよ), also simply known as TAMAYO, is a Japanese video game music composer. During her time at Capcom, she wrote music for games. After leaving Capcom in 1988, she joined Taito and became a member of their in-house band, Zuntata. She later joined up with Japanese singer Cyua to form the group Betta Flash.

Career 
Kawamoto was one of the first musicians hired at Capcom. At Capcom, she was credited under the alias "Tamayan" or "Tamatama". She produced music for games such as Commando, Black Tiger, and Ghouls 'n Ghosts. She also composed music for Exed Exes. Kamamoto later left Capcom in 1988. In 1989, she joined Taito as a composer, becoming a member of their house band and sound team, Zuntata. While in Zuntata, Kawamoto composed the soundtracks for Yuyu no Quiz de Go! Go! and the Ray series, including RayForce, RayStorm, and RayCrisis. 

According to Kawamoto in an interview, shortly after she left Zuntata, a prior coworker that was still working at Zuntata invited her to a party where they introduced her to the singer Cyua. Kawamoto later joined up with Cyua to form the group Betta Flash, with Kawamoto composing their songs and Cyua being the vocalist. Betta Flash's single, Erinyes, is featured as the closing song in the anime Night Wizard. Betta Flash also arranged new songs for the CD set, "Ray'z Music Chronology," which was released in 2017.

Music credits 
Buster Bros.
Ghouls 'n Ghosts (Arcade)

References

External links 
Interview by Capcom
Interview with Zutata Members

Year of birth missing (living people)
Capcom people
Japanese women composers
Living people
Taito people
Video game composers